Kalkaji Mandir, also known as Kalkaji Temple, is a Hindu mandir or temple, dedicated to the Hindu Goddess Kali. The temple (mandir) is situated in the southern part of New Delhi, in Kalkaji, India, a locality that has derived its name from the temple and is located opposite the Nehru Place business centre and close to the Okhla railway station, Kalkaji Mandir metro station. Hindus believe that the image of the Goddess Kalka here is a self-manifested one.

History
The temple was rebuilt later by Marathas

Though the temple is thought to be much older, the oldest portions of the present building are believed to have been constructed not earlier than the 1764 AD by the Marathas, with additions in 1816 by Mirza Raja Kidar Nath, the Peshkar of Akbar II During the second half of the twentieth century, a considerable number of Dharamshalas were constructed around the temple by  Hindu bankers and merchants of Delhi. The temple itself is built on the land of Shamlat Thok Brahmins and Thok Jogians who are also the pujari's of the temple and who perform Puja Sewa. The Thok Brahmins consist of Four Thullas, namely Thulla Tansukh, Thulla Rambaksh, Thulla Bahadur, and Thulla Jasram. they are classified into Gharbari Jogi and Kanphada Jogi.

Legend

According to a Hindu legend, Kalika Devi was born at the site where the temple is situated.

It is believed that the Goddess Kalkaji, pleased with the prayers offered and rituals performed by the gods on the advice of Lord Brahma, appeared at the site of the temple and blessed them, and settled at the site. During the Mahabharata, Lord Krishna and the Pandavas are said to have worshipped Kali at this temple during the reign of Yudhisthira. The temple itself is believed to have been constructed by Thok Brahmins and Thok Jogians at the order of Kali.

It is also called Jayanti Peetha or Manokamna Siddha Peetha. " Manokamna" literally means desire, " Siddha" means fulfillment, and " Peetha" means shrine. So, it is believed to be the holy shrine where one gets the blessings of Maa Kalika Devi (Goddess or Mother Kalika) for the fulfillment of one's desires.

Legend of Lal Baba

Modern structure
The temple complex, as it stands today, is constructed of brick masonry, finished with plaster and marble, and is surrounded by a pyramidal tower. The central chamber which is 12-sided in the plan, 24 feet across, with a doorway in each side, is paved with marble and is surrounded by a verandah 8'9" wide and contains 36 arched openings or exterior doorways. This verandah encloses the central chamber from all sides. In the middle of this arcade, opposite the eastern doorway,  are two red sandstone tigers sitting on a marble pedestal. Both the pedestal, as well as the marble railings, contain Nastaʿlīq inscriptions of recent origin. Between the tigers, there is a stone image of Kali Devi with her name engraved in Hindi, and a trident of stone standing before it.

The temple complex is situated on the Delhi Metro between the Nehru Place bus terminus and business center and Okhla railway station and industrial area, and next to the Baháʼí Faith's Lotus Temple. Close to the temple, on a hill in the east of Kailash Colony and near the ISKCON temple, lies an edict of Ashoka, dating from the 3rd century BC.

Rituals
The temple is visited by worshippers all year round, but the culmination point of their prayers and celebration is during the twice-yearly festival of Navratri, a nine-day Hindu festival, in spring and autumn, during which a large fair is organised. Devotees gather and sing hymns and songs praising the Goddess Durga. During these nine days, many tradesmen selling various handicrafts come to the temple to boost their business.  Devotees stand outside in serpentine queues for their turn to get a glimpse of the goddess.

The major ritual consists of offering and bathing the idol (Mata Snanam) with milk followed by an aarti every morning (6 am) and evening (7.30 pm). This, in turn, is followed by hymn recitation. Offerings can be purchased just before the entrance of the temple. The Puja Archana and other rituals are performed turn by turn (Monthly Basis) by Pujaris consisting of more than 1,000 Nai families who are the descendants of four main clans (thules) of Brahmin pujaris and one clan of Jogis/Mahants.
 
The atmosphere around the temple is airy and bright with lights all night. Devotees also try to meditate there and an aarti is held in the evening.

See also
Kalka Cave Temple

References

External links
 Official website
 Kalka Devi Temple
 Kalka Mandir, Delhi Google Maps

Hindu temples in Delhi
Kali temples
South Delhi district